Bapst is a surname. Notable people with the surname include:

Jeanine Bapst (born 1968), Swiss ski mountaineer
John Bapst (1815–1887), Swiss Jesuit missionary and educator
Bapst Library, a Boston College library

See also
Bast (surname)